The canton of Novion-Porcien is a former French canton located in the department of Ardennes in the Champagne-Ardenne region (now part of Grand Est). This canton was organized around Novion-Porcien in the arrondissement of Rethel.

The last general councillor from this canton was Jean-François Leclet (UDI), elected in 1992.

Composition 
The canton of Novion-Porcien grouped together twenty-three municipalities and had 5,185 inhabitants (2012 census without double counts).

Auboncourt-Vauzelles
Chesnois-Auboncourt
Corny-Machéroménil
Faissault
Faux
Grandchamp
Hagnicourt
Justine-Herbigny
Lucquy
Mesmont
La Neuville-lès-Wasigny
Neuvizy
Novion-Porcien
Puiseux
Saulces-Monclin
Sery
Sorcy-Bauthémont
Vaux-Montreuil
Viel-Saint-Remy
Villers-le-Tourneur
Wagnon
Wasigny
Wignicourt

References 

Former cantons of Ardennes (department)
2015 disestablishments in France
States and territories disestablished in 2015